The Neva embankment refer to various embankments along the Neva River in Saint Petersburg, Russia:

 The Admiralty Embankment (Admiralteyskaya Naberezhnaya), a street along the Neva River in Central Saint Petersburg, named after the Admiralty Board. Between 1919 and 1944 the street was known as Roshal Embankment, named after the revolutionary S. G. Roshal
 The English Embankment (Angliyskaya Naberezhnaya), a street along the Neva River in Central Saint Petersburg. It has been historically one of the most fashionable streets in Saint Petersburg
 The Kutuzov Embankment (Naberezhnaya Kutuzova)
 The Palace Embankment (Dvortsovaya Naberezhnaya), a street along the Neva River in Central Saint Petersburg which contains the complex of the Hermitage Museum buildings (including the Winter Palace), the Hermitage Theatre, the Marble Palace, the Vladimir Palace, the New Michael Palace and the Summer Garden
 The Universitetskaya Embankment, a 1.2 km long embankment on the right bank of the Bolshaya Neva, on Vasilievsky Island in Saint Petersburg, Russia. Starting at the Spit of Vasilievsky Island, it spans between Palace Bridge and Blagoveshchensky Bridge

See also 
 Embankment (disambiguation)